Wounded is a 2013 Spanish drama film directed by Fernando Franco which stars Marian Álvarez. It is a Kowalski Films, Pantalla Partida, Elamedia, Encanta Films and Ferdydurke Films production.

Plot 
The fiction follows a 28-year-old woman with a dysfunctional personality outside her job, unknowingly suffering from a BPD condition.

Cast

Release 
The film screened at the San Sebastián International Film Festival (SSIFF) in September 2013. It was theatrically released in Spain on 4 October 2013.

Awards and nominations 

|-
| align = "center" rowspan = "2" | 2013 || 61st San Sebastián International Film Festival || Silver Shell for Best Actress || Marian Álvarez ||  || 
|-
| 28th Mar del Plata International Film Festival || Silver Astor for Best Actress || Marian Álvarez ||  || 
|-
| align = "center" rowspan = "12" | 2014 || rowspan = "3" | 1st Feroz Awards || colspan = "2" | Best Drama Film ||  || rowspan = "3" | 
|-
| Best Director || Fernando Franco || 
|-
| Best Actress || Marian Álvarez || 
|-
| rowspan = "2" | 19th Forqué Awards || colspan = "2" | Best Film ||  || rowspan = "2" | 
|-
| Best Actress || Marian Álvarez || 
|-
|  rowspan = "6" | 28th Goya Awards || colspan = "2" | Best Film ||  || rowspan = "6" | 
|-
| Best Actress || Marian Álvarez || 
|-
| Best Original Screenplay ||  Enric Rufas, Fernando Franco || 
|-
| Best New Director || Fernando Franco || 
|-
| Best Editing || David Pinillos || 
|-
| Best Sound || Aitor Berenguer Abasolo, Jaime Fernández, Nacho Arenas || 
|-
| 27th European Film Awards || Best Actress || Marian Álvarez ||  || align = "center" | 
|}

See also 
 List of Spanish films of 2013

References

External links 

2013 drama films
2013 films
Spanish drama films
Borderline personality disorder in fiction
2010s Spanish-language films
Kowalski Films films
2010s Spanish films